Jean-Joseph Taillasson (6 July 1745 – 11 November 1809) was a French history painter and portraitist, draftsman, and art critic.

Biography
Taillasson was born at Blaye, near Bordeaux. His poem "Le Danger des règles dans les Arts" was noted with approval by the Danish visitor to Paris, Tønnes Christian Bruun-Neergaard, and an elegy "Sur la Nuit", he thought, seemed fit to soften the least sensitive heart. He matured his talent in the Paris ateliers of Joseph-Marie Vien (from 1764) and Nicolas Bernard Lépicié and, having won third place in the Prix de Rome competition, 1769, spent four years, 1773–77, in Italy. At his return to Paris he set an early example of neoclassicism.

His Observations sur quelques grands peintres offered anti-academic advice somewhat at variance with his own manner; some of the collected observations had previously appeared in the Journal des Arts. He died in Paris.

Selected works
 Self Portrait, Musée du Louvre
 Jeune Homme, vêtu d'une robe, levant les bras, Musée du Louvre
 La Nymphe surprise, Musée des Augustins, Toulouse
 Timoléon à qui les Syracusiens amènent des étrangers, Musée Ingres,  Montauban; another version is at the Musée des Beaux-Arts, Tours.
 Un Vieillard, assis, lisant, Musée du Louvre
 Vieillard drapé, debout, vu de dos, Musée du Louvre.
 Claude-Louis, comte de Saint-Germain (1707-1778), 1777 Musée national de Versailles
 La Naissance de Louis XIII, 1782 Musée des Beaux-Arts, Pau
 La Madeleine au désert, 1784 Montreal Museum of Fine Arts
 Ulysse et Néoptolème enlevant à Philoctète les flèches d'Hercule, 1784 Musée des Beaux-Arts, Bordeaux; this was his morceau de reception at the Académie royale de peinture et de sculpture.
 Sabinus et Eponina découverts par les soldats de Vespasien 1787
 Virgil reading the 'Aeneid' to Augustus and Octavia, 1787 (National Gallery, London)
 Léandre et Héro, 1789 Musée des Beaux-Arts, Bordeaux
 "Seigneur! Voyez ces yeux" (Cleopatra of Syria is discovered by Rodogune to have poisoned the nuptial cup, a scene from Pierre Corneille's Rodogune (1644), 1791 Boston Museum of Fine Arts; Tønnes Christian Bruun-Neergaard considered that it had established the painter's reputation, and remarked that it had belonged to Citoyen Godefroy, a well-known amateur, who auction dsaletranspired in 1794.
 Pauline, femme de Sénèque, rappelée à la vie, 1791 Musée du Louvre
 Olympias, 1799
 Andromache, 1800
 Rhadamate et Zénobie, 1806
 Spring (or Flora) leading Cupid back to Nature (Bowes Museum, County Durham, UK)

Notes

18th-century French painters
French male painters
19th-century French painters
French draughtsmen
1745 births
1809 deaths
19th-century French male artists
18th-century French male artists